MercyMe is an American contemporary Christian music band founded in Edmond, Oklahoma. The band consists of lead vocalist Bart Millard, percussionist Robby Shaffer, bassist Nathan Cochran and guitarists Michael Scheuchzer and Barry Graul.

The band formed in 1994 and released six independent albums before signing with INO Records in 2001.
The group first gained mainstream recognition with the crossover single "I Can Only Imagine", which elevated their debut album, Almost There, to triple platinum certification. Since then, the group has released eight additional studio albums (six of which have been certified gold) and a greatest hits album, 10. The group has also had 13 consecutive top 5 singles on the Billboard Christian Songs chart, with 7 of them reaching No. 1. MercyMe has won 8 Dove Awards and has had many Grammy Award nominations. On April 8, 2014, the band released its eighth studio album titled Welcome to the New. Their ninth studio album, Lifer, was released on March 31, 2017, and tenth, Inhale (Exhale), was released on April 30, 2021.

History

Formation and early years 

Singer Bart Millard met pianist James Phillip Bryson in Lakeland, Florida, after an invitation from his youth pastor. Both led a praise team on a trip to Europe. They both felt a call to work full-time in music. They later met the guitarist Michael John Scheuchzer, who joined them, then moved to Oklahoma City. The group was officially formed in 1994 in Henderson Hills Baptist Church in Edmond, Oklahoma.

In 1997, MercyMe moved to Nashville to find a record label. After a year, they left Nashville for Dallas and recorded an album. Then they settled in Greenville, Texas, and served at Highland Terrace Baptist Church.

The trio set up a studio and a "living area" in an old abandoned day-care center. Bassist Nathan Cochran and drummer Robby Shaffer later joined the band, accompanying the band in releasing six independent projects before signing with INO Records in 2001. Unlike their first three major label albums, their earlier indie projects tended to orient more towards rock rhythms. The group's name, "MercyMe", originated during Millard's time as a youth ministry intern in Florida. Concerned that her grandson was home whenever she called, Millard's grandmother would exclaim, "Well mercy me, why don't you get a real job?"

For several years, the band was a mainstay at the popular PlanetWisdom youth conference. The popularity of “I Can Only Imagine” and their meteoric rise led to their no longer leading worship at the conference.

Almost There, Spoken For and Undone (2001–2004) 

After signing with INO Records, the band released its first major debut album, Almost There. The single "I Can Only Imagine" earned the band a Dove Award in 2002 for song of the year. However, it was not until three years after its release that the song began to gain mainstream success, topping the Billboard 200 sales chart for seven weeks, and peaking at No. 71 on the Hot 100, No. 33 on the Mainstream Top 40, No. 27 on the Adult Top 40, No. 5 on the Adult Contemporary, and No. 52 on the Country Songs charts. The success of the single ultimately propelled Almost There to being certified double platinum, representing sales of over 2 million albums, as well as the single itself being certified platinum.

In 2002, MercyMe released Spoken For, which peaked at No. 2 on the Christian Albums chart. The album's two singles, "Spoken For" and "Word of God Speak", went on to peak at No. 1 on Christian radio charts, with "Word of God Speak" spending a record 22 weeks atop the newly created Billboard Christian Songs chart.
The album was eventually certified gold by the RIAA.

Spoken For earned the band three Dove Awards, but was to a certain extent overlooked by the attention that "I Can Only Imagine" was receiving in the mainstream markets at the time.

In 2003, guitarist Barry Graul, who had previously been with the Christian hard rock band Whitecross, joined MercyMe, giving MercyMe a second guitarist to provide greater depth on their third studio album, Undone. In 2004, the band headlined the "Imagine Tour" with fellow artists Amy Grant and Bebo Norman. In addition to headlining the "Imagine Tour", MercyMe released their third major label album, Undone, which peaked at No. 12 on the Billboard 200 and No. 1 on the Christian Albums charts, their highest debut on the chart at that point. The album spawned three successful singles – "Here With Me" (which topped the Christian Songs chart as well as reaching No. 12 on the Adult Contemporary chart and No. 38 on the Adult Top 40 chart), "Homesick" (which reached No. 3 on the Christian Songs chart and No. 9 on the Adult Contemporary charts), and "In the Blink of an Eye" (which topped the Christian Songs chart). The album itself won a Dove Award for Pop/Contemporary Album of the Year at the 36th GMA Dove Awards, and was certified gold by the RIAA.

MercyMe also released a live video album, MercyMe Live, in 2004, which eventually was certified platinum by the RIAA.

The Christmas Sessions and Coming Up to Breathe (2005–2006) 

In 2005, MercyMe launched a tour with Jeremy Camp, The Afters and Monk and Neagle in support of their album, Undone.

After releasing Undone in 2004, the band took a time to rest before their next big release, so they decided to work on a Christmas record. The Christmas Sessions was recorded and was released on September 27, 2005. The album spawned seven songs which hit the top 40 on the Christian Songs chart (with one hitting No. 1 and two others reaching the top ten), and four of these charted in the top 40 of the Adult Contemporary chart (with one peaking in the top 10). The album itself peaked at No. 64 on the Billboard 200 and No. 3 on the Christian Songs chart.

To promote The Christmas Sessions, MercyMe had a Christmas tour with Steven Curtis Chapman, who also released a Christmas album that year titled All I Really Want for Christmas.

In 2006, MercyMe released Coming Up to Breathe, which charted at No. 13 on the Billboard 200 and No. 1 on the Christian Albums chart. Although the band had earned a reputation for being an adult contemporary group with their other albums, the group decided to make Coming Up to Breathe a more rock-oriented album, in the vein of their earlier grunge-influenced albums. As such, it also peaked at No. 5 on the Top Rock Albums chart and No. 13 on the Top Alternative Albums chart, their only chart appearances on these records to date.

Coming Up to Breathe spawned three radio singles ("So Long Self", "Hold Fast", and "Bring the Rain"), two of which ("So Long Self" and "Bring the Rain") reached the top spot on the Christian Songs chart. "So Long Self" and "Hold Fast" also both reached the top 30 on the Adult Contemporary chart. Coming Up to Breathe was eventually certified gold by the RIAA.

In support of Coming Up to Breathe, MercyMe headlined the "Coming Up to Breathe Tour", along with Audio Adrenaline (on its farewell tour) and Phil Wickham, seeing half their shows sell out two weeks into the tour.

All That is Within Me, Coming Up to Breathe: Acoustic and 10 (2007–2009) 

On November 20, 2007, MercyMe released All That Is Within Me. Millard, the band's lead singer, had believed that All That is Within Me was going to be a worship album with half of the songs being cover songs and the other half original songs; however, when the band got in studio, they ended up having written all the songs found in this album.

Upon release, the album peaked at No. 15 on the Billboard 200 and No. 1 on the Christian Songs chart. The album contained three singles ("God With Us", "You Reign" and "Finally Home"), all of which reached the top three on the Christian Songs chart; "Finally Home" also peaked at No. 17 on the Adult Contemporary chart (their last appearance on the chart to date). All That Is Within Me was also certified gold by the RIAA.

In 2008, the band released Coming Up to Breathe: Acoustic, an acoustic version of their earlier release Coming Up to Breathe.

On April 7, 2009, MercyMe released their first greatest hits compilation, 10, a double album consisting of 15 studio recordings (12 of which were previously singles and 3 of which were new recordings) and 11 live or concept videos, as well as several documentaries on the band. The album charted at No. 18 on the Billboard 200 and No. 1 on the Christian Songs chart, although no singles were released from the album.

The Generous Mr. Lovewell and The Worship Sessions (2010–2011) 

MercyMe's sixth studio album, The Generous Mr. Lovewell, was released on May 4, 2010. The album itself peaked at No. 3 on the Billboard 200 (MercyMe's highest debut to date and first top 5 album ever on the chart) and No. 1 on the Christian Albums chart. The album (a concept album relating around the overall theme of love and vaguely relating to its self-titled character) has also spawned three singles – "All of Creation", "Beautiful", and "Move" – all of which reached the top spot on the Christian Songs chart. Upon wrapping up "The Generous Mr. Lovewell" tour, MercyMe was asked to perform the national anthem at a Dallas Cowboys game.

In 2011, the band released The Worship Sessions, a worship album that was released exclusively at Family Christian Book Stores.

The Hurt & the Healer, Welcome to the New, Lifer, Inhale (Exhale), Always Only Jesus (2012–present) 

The Hurt & the Healer was released on May 22, 2012 by Fair Trade and Columbia Records. The album debuted at No. 7 on the Billboard 200, selling 33,000 copies.

Welcome to the New, the band's eighth studio album, was released on April 8, 2014 and is produced by David Garcia and Ben Glover. Singles from this album include the pre-release single "Shake", and post-release singles "Greater" and "Dear Younger Me".

Lifer, MercyMe's ninth studio album, was released on March 31, 2017, with the lead single off the album being "Even If", which was released on February 17, 2017. It samples the chorus of the hymn "It Is Well with My Soul." The song reached No. 1 on the Billboard Hot Christian Songs chart for three weeks, becoming their twelfth number one single. It also charted on the Bubbling Under Hot 100 chart at No. 20. The second single, "Grace Got You", was released on March 2, 2018. It peaked at No. 3 on the Christian Songs chart and became their record extending 15th chart topper on the Christian Airplay chart. It was nominated for the 2019 Grammy Award for Best Contemporary Christian Music Performance/Song. The third single, "Best News Ever", was released on October 5, 2018.

In 2019 they released the single "Almost Home", and then in 2020 "Hurry Up and Wait" and "Say I Won't", from their tenth album inhale (exhale) that was released on April 30, 2021.

Their eleventh studio album, Always Only Jesus, was released on October 21, 2022. The first single they released was "Then Christ Came" on June 3, 2022. "Better Days Coming" was released on September 9, 2022, and "To Not Worship You" was released on September 30, 2022.

Charity 

In 2005, MercyMe participated in a benefit concert at Belmont University with various other country, gospel and contemporary Christian artists for the people affected by the Asian tsunami.

In 2009, MercyMe conducted a tour in partnership with Compassion International and Imagine A Cure in order to raise money to help kids with diabetes through Imagine A Cure and people with medical needs around the world through Compassion International.

Tour bus accident 

On Saturday, August 8, 2009, at approximately 1:15 am in Fort Wayne, Indiana, the MercyMe tour bus was traveling through an intersection on a green light when an oncoming passenger vehicle made a left turn on red into the path of the bus, which resulted in a collision killing two passengers of the car and resulting in the vehicle's pregnant driver experiencing miscarriage from automotive trauma. MercyMe was to perform at Six Flags St. Louis but the park issued a statement saying the show was rescheduled because the band was "involved in a vehicle accident in Indiana".

Despite news reports claiming that the band remained silent during the days after the crash, not contacting the family of the deceased and injured, MercyMe did release a statement through their publicist the day of the crash.

Members 

Current members
 Bart Millard – lead vocals (1994–present)
 Michael John Scheuchzer – guitars, backing vocals, keyboards (1994–present)
 Robin Troy "Robby" Shaffer – drums, percussion (1997–present)
 Nathan Cochran – bass, backing vocals, keyboards (1998–present)
 Barry Graul – guitars, backing vocals (2003–present)

Former members
 Jim Richmond - guitar (1994-1995)
 James Phillip "Jim" Bryson – keyboards (1994–2014)
 Kendall Combes – bass, backing vocals (1994–1998)
 Trent Austin – drums (1994–1997)
 David Cowan - drums (1994-1995)

Discography 

 Pleased to Meet You (1995)
 Traces of Rain (1997)
 Traces of Rain Volume II (1998)
 The Need (1999)
 The Worship Project (1999)
 Look (2000)
 Almost There (2001)
 Spoken For (2002)
 Undone (2004)
 The Christmas Sessions (2005)
 Coming Up to Breathe (2006)
 All That Is Within Me (2007)
 The Generous Mr. Lovewell (2010)
 The Hurt & the Healer (2012)
 Welcome to the New (2014)
 MercyMe, It's Christmas! (2015)
 Lifer (2017)
  Inhale (Exhale)  (2021)
 Always Only Jesus (2022)

Awards and accolades

Billboard Music Awards

|-
|rowspan="3"|2011
|MercyMe
|Top Christian Artist
|
|-
|The Generous Mr. Lovewell
|Top Christian Album
|
|-
|"All of Creation"
|Top Christian Song
|
|-
|2012
|rowspan="2"|MercyMe
|rowspan="2"|Top Christian Artist
|
|-
|rowspan="2"|2013
|
|-
|The Hurt & the Healer
|Top Christian Album
|
|-
|rowspan="3"|2015
|MercyMe
|Top Christian Artist
|
|-
|Welcome to the New
|Top Christian Album
|
|-
|"Greater"
|Top Christian Song
|
|-
|rowspan="2"|2016
|MercyMe
|Top Christian Artist
|
|-
|"Flawless"
|Top Christian Song
|
|-
|rowspan="3"|2018
| MercyMe
|Top Christian Artist
|
|-
|Lifer
|Top Christian Album
|
|-
|"Even If"
|Top Christian Song
|
|-
|2019 || MercyMe|| Top Christian Artist || 
|}

GMA Dove Awards
 2002 Song of the Year – "I Can Only Imagine"
 2002 Pop/Contemporary Recorded Song of the Year – "I Can Only Imagine"
 2004 Song of the Year – "Word of God Speak"
 2004 Artist of the Year
 2004 Group of the Year
 2004 Pop/Contemporary Song of the Year – "Word of God Speak"
 2005 Pop/Contemporary Album of the Year – Undone
 2005 Special Event Album of the Year – The Passion of the Christ: Songs
 ASCAP Awards
 2003 Bart Millard awarded Christian Songwriter of the Year at the 25th annual ASCAP Christian Music Awards.
 American Music Awards
 2004 Favorite Contemporary Inspirational Artist
 2010 Favorite Contemporary Inspirational Artist
 Billboard magazine Decade (2000–2009) Awards
 No. 1 Christian song of the Decade: "Word of God Speak"
 No. 16 Christian song of the Decade: "Here with Me"
 No. 19 Christian song of the Decade: "God with Us"
 No. 35 Christian song of the Decade: "You Reign"
 No. 48 Christian song of the Decade: "In the Blink of an Eye"
 No. 49 Christian song of the Decade: "Bring the Rain"
 No. 4 Christian Album Artist of the Decade
 No. 4 Christian Album of the Decade: "Almost There"
 No. 38 Christian Album of the Decade: "Undone"
 No. 46 Christian Album of the Decade: "Spoken For"

References

External links 

 
 [ MercyMe] at Billboard.com

American Christian musical groups
American pop music groups
Christian rock groups from Texas
Columbia Records artists
Epic Records artists
Fair Trade Services artists
Grammy Award winners
Musical groups established in 1994
Performers of contemporary Christian music
Performers of contemporary worship music